Bowden (pronounced  or ) is an English surname of Old English (Anglo-Saxon) origins.  In Old English it translates roughly into "dweller by the top of a hill", and is also the name of the towns of Bowden, Ashprington, and Bowden, Yealmpton, in Devon, as well as Bowden, Derbyshire.  There is also a town of Bowden in rural Leicestershire which was recorded as "Bugedone" in the Domesday Book.

People with the surname Bowden
 Adam Bowden (born 1982), British international track athlete
 Andrew Bowden (born 1930), British Conservative politician
 B. V. Bowden, Baron Bowden (1910–1989), English scientist and educationist
 Ben Bowden (born 1994), American baseball player
 Benjamin Bowden (1906–1998), English automobile and bicycle designer
 Billy Bowden (born 1963), international cricket umpire from New Zealand
 Breck Bowden, American environmental scientist
 A notable American football coaching family:
 Bobby Bowden (1929–2021), American football coach of several college programs, most notably Florida State University
 Tommy Bowden (born 1954), son of Bobby; former coach at several programs, most recently Clemson University
 Terry Bowden (born 1956), son of Bobby; motivational speaker, college football analyst and current University of Akron coach
 Jeff Bowden (born ), son of Bobby; assistant at several programs, currently at Akron under Terry
 Charles Bowden (1886–1972), New Zealand politician
 Charles Bowden (1945–2014), American author, journalist, and essayist
 Claude Bowden (1897–1984), British air force officer and aeromodeller
 Daniel Bowden (born 1986), New Zealand rugby union player
 David Bowden (1937–2004), Australian Anglican bishop
 Dominic Bowden (born 1977), New Zealand television presenter
 Doug Bowden (born 1927), New Zealand cricketer
 Eric Bowden (1871–1931), Australian solicitor and politician
 Francis C. Bowden (1903–1972), American pharmacist, mayor of Anchorage, Alaska 1946-1948
 Sir Frank Bowden, 1st Baronet (1848–1921), British businessman, founder of the Raleigh Bicycle Company
 Gerald Bowden (1935–2020), British Conservative politician
 Harold Bowden (1880–1960), son of Frank Bowden, American-born British businessman
 Harry Bowden (1907–1965), American artist
 Herbert Bowden, Baron Aylestone (1905–1994), British Labour politician
 Herbert Bowden (footballer) (born 1888), Australian rules footballer
 Jack Bowden  (1916–1988), Irish cricketer and field hockey player
 James Bowden (American football) (born 1973), American football player
 James Bowden (footballer) (1880–1951), English footballer
 Jamie Bowden (born 1960), British diplomat
 Jim Bowden (baseball) (born 1961), general manager of the Washington Nationals baseball team
 Joel Bowden (born 1978), Australian rules footballer
 Jonathan Bowden (1962–2012), right-wing British political figure 
 Katrina Bowden (born 1988), American actress
 Lemuel J. Bowden (1815–1864), American lawyer and politician
 Lilan Bowden (born 1985), American actress and comedian
 Lynn Bowden (born 1997), American football player
 Mark Bowden (English author) (born 1970), British writer on body language
 Mark Bowden (born 1951), American writer
 Michael Bowden (Australian rules footballer)
 Michael Bowden (baseball) (born 1986), American baseball pitcher
 Monty Bowden (1865–1892), English cricketer and wicket-keeper
 Mwata Bowden  (born 1947), American jazz reeds player
 Norris Bowden (1926–1991), Canadian figure skater
 Oswald Bowden (1912–1977), English footballer 
 Patrick Bowden (born 1981), Australian rules footballer
 Ray Bowden (1909–1998), English footballer
 Richard Bowden (born 1945), American country singer of the "Pinkard & Bowden" duo
 Ron Bowden (born 1942), Australian politician
 Sandra Bowden (born 1943), American artist and painter
 Vivian Lee Bowden (1943–2017), American science journalist

References

English-language surnames